Encino is Spanish for oak.  Encino may refer to:


Places

United States
 Encino, Los Angeles, California, a neighborhood
 Encino, New Mexico, a village
 Encino, Texas, a census-designated place

Colombia
 Encino, Santander, a municipality

Other uses
 Hyundai Kona, a 2017 SUV sold in China as the Hyundai Encino

See also
 Encino Formation, a geologic formation in Mexico
 El Encino Stakes, an American Thoroughbred horse race run between 1954 and 2011